Iago Ferreira Januario (born November 1, 1985) is a Brazilian former professional baseball first baseman. He represented Brazil at the 2013 World Baseball Classic.

He spent the 2010–2011 seasons as a pitcher for the Boston Red Sox Dominican Summer League team and was switched to first base when he signed with the Tampa Bay Rays in 2012 and played in the Venezuelan Summer League.

References

External links

1993 births
2013 World Baseball Classic players
Brazilian expatriate baseball players in the United States
Brazilian expatriate baseball players in Venezuela
Dominican Summer League Red Sox players
Living people
People from Marília
Venezuelan Summer League Rays players
Brazilian expatriate baseball players in the Dominican Republic
Sportspeople from São Paulo (state)